Main Core is an alleged American government database containing information on those believed to be threats to national security.

History 
The existence of the database was first asserted in May 2008 by Christopher Ketcham and again in July 2008 by Tim Shorrock.

Description 
The Main Core data, which is believed to come from the NSA, FBI, CIA, and other sources, is collected and stored without warrants or court orders. The database's name derives from the fact that it contains "copies of the 'main core' or essence of each item of intelligence information on Americans produced by the FBI and the other agencies of the U.S. intelligence community".

, there were allegedly eight million Americans listed in the database as possible threats, often for trivial reasons, whom the government may choose to track, question, or detain in a time of crisis.

See also
 Disposition Matrix
 Rex 84
 FBI Index
 Investigative Data Warehouse
 National Security and Homeland Security Presidential Directive
 NSA warrantless surveillance controversy
 PRISM (surveillance program)

References

External links
  Radar article by Christopher Ketcham, May/June 2008
 NSA's Domestic Spying Grows As Agency Sweeps Up Data by Siobhan Gorman, Updated March 10, 2008 12:01 a.m. ET 

1980s establishments in the United States
Espionage
Federal Emergency Management Agency
Government databases in the United States
Continuity of government in the United States